Private Lives of Nashville Wives is an American reality television series that premiered on February 24, 2014, and aired on TNT. The series revolves around the social circle of six women who reside in Nashville, Tennessee.

Cast

Main
 Ana Fernandez – Fernandez is a single mother of two, and the identical twin to Betty Malo.
 Betty Malo – Malo is married to The Mavericks lead singer and songwriter, Raul Malo.
 Cassie Chapman – Chapman is married to Christian music artist Gary Chapman.
 Erika Page White – White formerly starred in soap operas and is looking to return to acting after a hiatus. She is married to Bryan White.
 Jenny Terrell – Terrell is the vice president at a leading Internet company, and is married to JT Terrell.
 Sarah Davidson – Davidson is the ex-wife of songwriter Dallas Davidson.

Recurring
 Tina Brady – Brady is married to Stan Brady, a Nashville dentist.

Episodes

References

External links

2010s American reality television series
2014 American television series debuts
English-language television shows
TNT (American TV network) original programming
Nashville, Tennessee
Women in Tennessee